was a village located in Higashichikuma District, Nagano Prefecture, Japan.

As of 2003, the village had an estimated population of 2,148 and a density of 66.46 persons per km². The total area was 32.32 km².

On October 11, 2005, Honjō, along with the villages of Sakai and Sakakita (all from Higashichikuma District), was merged to create the village of Chikuhoku.

Dissolved municipalities of Nagano Prefecture
Chikuhoku, Nagano